The Palace of the Counts of Penafiel, commonly known as Penafiel Palace, is a Portuguese palace located in the civil parish of Santa Maria Maior, in the municipality of Lisbon. It serves as the global headquarters of the Community of Portuguese Language Countries, also known as the Lusophone Commonwealth.

History 

The palace was built in the first half of the 17th century over the remains of the Palace of the High Courier, the courtly officer responsible for communications within the kingdom. Between 1606 and 1755 it was the residence of the High-Couriers, becoming the seat of the postal authority for the Kingdom. But, the palace was only concluded in 1776, after remodelling associated with its reconstruction, following the devastating 1755 Lisbon earthquake.

When the office of High Courier was abolished in 1797, is resident made the Count of Penafiel in compensation, thereby resulting in its new designation.

In 1859, the kingdom's last official High-Courier to the Kingdom, Manuel José da Maternidade da Mata de Sousa Coutinho, 1st Count of Penafiel (n.1782) died in the residence. The palace passed into the hands of his only daughter, the 2nd Countess and 1st Marquess of Penafiel, D. Maria da Assunção da Mata de Sousa Coutinho (1827-1892). There was a campaign around 1865 to remodel the palace, that included redecoration, the alteration of the principal access and the arrange of the frontispiece under the direction of António Tomás da Fonseca. Following the death of the marquessa in 1891, the palace began to be partially rented.

Between 1894 and 1904, the Viscountess of Almeida and her four daughters resided at the palace, using an access along the Rua das Pedras Negras, 16. Two years later (and until 1910), from the a doorway along Rua de São Mamede, 63, Engineer Manuel Afonso Espregueira, the de facto Finance Minister under King D. Portugal and D. Manuel II. But, by the end of 1904, a great part of the palace was occupied by the residence of the Ambassador of Spain.

The palace required significant repairs in 1914, and was in the course of being purchased by the Caminhos de Ferro do Estado (State Railway), and eventually concluded in 1919. By 1941, the Direção-Geral dos Caminhos de Ferro (Directorate-General of the State Railway) was operating from the site, but was eventually replaced by the Conselho Superior de Obras Públicas (Superior Council of Public Works), forerunner of the Ministério das Obras Publicas, Transportes e Comunicações.

The Comissão para a Aquisição de Mobiliário (Commission for Furniture Acquisition), along with the architects Eduardo Moreira Santos and Luís Benavente, began to deal with providing furniture for Public Works, complementing the work and expansion at that the Direção Regional dos Edifícios de Lisboa (Lisbon Regional Directorate for Buildings). The furnishing for the Gabinete do Presidente was studied by Luís Benavente. In this first phase, the furniture was acquired from the factories Aséta (in Porto) and Madeiras & Móveis (from Praia da Granja). Between 1951 and 1952, the second phase of the project was furnished by factories Alberto de Sousa Reis (in Espinho) and Olaio (in Lisbon).

In 2011 the palace was offered to the Community of Portuguese Language Countries to serve as its global headquarters in Portugal.

Architecture
The palace is situated in an urban location, occupying the entire block marked by a very sharp drop.
The L-shaped building is divided into two volumes, a northern and eastern wings, topped in roofing tile. The principal elevation, in the north, is characterized by a succession of wall, doors with access to the patio and top of the northern wing, delimited laterally by granite cornerstones. Above are two floors divided by cornice and separated by friezes, animated by the decorated windows on the ground floor and others with rounded windows and iron grade along the second floor. Between the doors and over a portion of the graded wall, there are two angels supported by pillars and the coat-or-arms of the Counts of Penafiel, surmounted by crown.

The rectangular patio, defined by the limits of the residence and small informal garden (in the northeast). The wainscotting is visible for the monochromatic azulejo tiles, that predate the northern part of the eastern wing, whose ground floor is marked by three arches with the access to the interior. The southern elevation, from the ground floor is decorated in cornerstone and has four floors, and includes three corps, including central plan, decorated in rock-like veneer coating until the last floor. There are 12 vains per floor with windows and doors, with the principal spaces occupying the first floor of the north wing.

References

Notes

Sources

External links 
 Penafiel (Palácio) (In Portuguese)
 CPLP ganha nova sede em Lisboa (In Portuguese)

Community of Portuguese Language Countries
Palaces in Lisbon
High-Courier of the Kingdom of Portugal